Histeridae is a family of beetles commonly known as clown beetles or hister beetles. This very diverse group of beetles contains 3,900 species found worldwide. They can be easily identified by their shortened elytra that leaves two of the seven tergites exposed, and their geniculate (elbowed) antennae with clubbed ends. These predatory feeders are most active at night and will fake death if they feel threatened. This family of beetles will occupy almost any kind of niche throughout the world. Hister beetles have proved useful during forensic investigations to help in time of death estimation. Also, certain species are used in the control of livestock pests that infest dung and to control houseflies. Because they are predacious and will even eat other hister beetles, they must be isolated when collected.

Characteristics

The hister beetles are easily identified by their shiny elytra which is typically shiny black or metallic green. The two main shapes for this family are oval and flat. The elytra is shorter than the abdomen with typically two of the seven tergites exposed. Hister beetles have specialized heads that can retract into their prothorax and two geniculate (elbowed) antennae with clubbed ends. As predators, hister beetles commonly feed on the egg, larval, and adult stages of other insects. Certain species are also used to control livestock pests that infest dung or to control house flies. Histeridae are most active at night and they will play dead if they feel threatened.

Etymology

Histeridae was named by Leonard Gyllenhaal. Histeridae has two common names, the “clown” beetle and the “hister” beetle. There have been several theories explaining the origin of these common names. One theory for the “hister” nickname comes from the work of Juvenal, a Roman poet. Juvenal used the word “hister” to mean a dirty, lowly being. Another theory for the origin of this beetle's name stems from the fact that in Latin, “hister” means actor. Many people believe the name is associated with the hister beetles’ ability to imitate death when they are disturbed. Still, some believe this family of beetles was named for its physical characteristics. Clown beetles have flattened legs, which can be compared to a clown's flat shoes or loose-fitting pants.

Anatomy
The elytra and forewings are normally well developed in beetles, but in Histeridae the elytra are shortened and rectangular. The shortened elytra expose the final two of the seven tergites. The head has compound eyes, a mandible mouthpart, and shortened antennae. A distinctive characteristic is that the antennae are elbowed and contain three antennomeres that form a club at the end.

Clown beetles have an open circulatory system within its hemocoel, also known as a body cavity. They have a tube shaped heart that spans the length of the body, and use hemolymph as blood. This blood does not contain any oxygen, but carries nutrients throughout the body. Spiracles are located on the abdomen and are the tracheal system of the beetle. Oxygen is brought into the body by spiracles and tiny sacs exchange the oxygen like a mammal's lung.

Habitat

Hister beetles are found throughout the world in various habitats. Histeridae have been located in North America, Central America, Europe, Asia, and Australia, but each hister beetle occupies certain niches. The beetles live in dung, carrion, dead vegetation, sandy areas, under tree bark, mammal burrows, and ant/termite colonies. Charactertistics of the hister beetle are dependent upon its habitat. For example, the flat hister beetles are found under bark, while the cylindrical beetles are not. The shape of the beetle will vary from species to species.

A remarkable ability of some hister beetles is their capacity to live in close proximity with ants (myrmecophiles) and termites (termitophiles). The hister beetles can live in harmony with the ants or prey on the ants, depending on the species.

Histeridae live in widespread habitats because they feed on other arthropods. As new food sources are introduced into an environment, the predators of that food source will soon follow. Histeridae live in areas where their prey feed. Some examples are mammalian nests where other arthropods scavenge for food or carrion where maggots will arrive.

Evolutionary history 
The oldest record of the family is Antigracilus from the Aptian aged Yixian Formation of China, which was resolved as the sister species to all living members of the family. The oldest crown group representatives are known from the Burmese amber, around 99 million years old, including those belonging to the extant subfamily Haeteriinae, and the living genus Onthophilus.

Feeding habits 
The larvae and adult forms of Histeridae have been known to feed on dung, carrion, decomposing vegetation, other insects, larvae, and pupae. Hister beetles are able to locate both dung and carrion through olfaction. When found on dung, carrion and vegetation, the hister beetles will feed on the fly larvae found there. The predacious hister beetle will feed on soft-bodied insect eggs and larvae, Diptera in particular. Some species of Histeridae will even feed on other Histeridae.

The majority of Histeridae species prefer dried, decaying habitats.

Some Histeridae species live in an integrated nest with ants and termites. Some species have been found to be fed by the ants, while others simply feed on leftover insect larvae that the ants do not want. In contrast, in their adult stage Psiloscelis will actually feed on adult ants.

Because the Histeridae are predacious, they can be utilized as control agents, but must be stored in isolation. The hister beetles have proven useful in both the control of pest flies in poultry houses and pastures, and against pest beetles of stored food products.

Development
Histeridae goes through holometabolous development, meaning it goes through four stages of egg, larva, pupa and adult. The larval form does not resemble the adult form and the pupa, non-feeding and has internally developing wings.

Egg
The average time of development from egg to adult at 30 °C is 20.5 days. The eggs of most species are off-white and oval in shape. The egg takes on average 3.8±0.02 days to hatch into the first instar larva. The chorion is shiny and smooth. In certain species like Epierus or Platylomalus it can look pale brown and be leathery in texture.

Larval
The larval stage of the beetle typically goes through two instars, and the second instar is the longest stage of its entire development, taking up 39% of overall development time. It takes 5.1±0.1 days on average for the first instar to develop into the second. The larval form of the insect will range in length from three millimeters to several centimeters. They have a membranous body with a limited amount of sclerotization around the head. There is some pigmentation around the body and it is horizontally segmented. The legs are short and do not help much in locomotion. They move mostly through muscular contraction.

Pupal
The pupal form of the beetle is similar in appearance to the adult form. They have outer cells produced in the larval stages that are reinforced with proteinaceous cement. This makes their outer shell harder and protects them during this vulnerable stage. While they pupate, they breathe through spiracles on the abdomen. The beetle is non-feeding and immobile in this stage, as their internal structure is breaking down and rebuilding to its adult form. Under good temperature conditions, the hister beetle will stay in the pupal stage for about a week.

Male and female structures
The male and female reproductive organs are hidden underneath the last few sternites on the mesosternal (mesosternum) side. The female's structure is modified to work as an ovipositor while the male's is adapted as a copulatory structure. The female has oviducts that carry the developed eggs from the ovaries to the ovipositor. The males also have a duct that carries the sperm from the testes to the copulatory structure, which stays concealed until copulation. When fertilization takes place, the male leaves enough sperm in the female to fertilize all the eggs in the female's ovaries. The excess sperm is kept in a special structure called spermatheca which holds the sperm until the eggs are fully developed.

Subclades
 
There are four subclades of Histeridae that are predators worth mentioning. These subclades are known as:

1. Dendrobites

They have two common body shapes. One is flattened while the other has a more cylindrical appearance. The former usually lives near tree barks. This is because the prey they feed on, fly eggs, are found near tree bark. The latter also feed on insects and prefer to live in forested areas. Species of the cylindrical Dendrobites usually hunt prey that is unique for that species.

2. Geobiotes

This subclade is the most diverse and the largest of the hister predator subclasses. The Geobites' body structures are generally circular, and they are known for their digging tendencies. This subclass is separated into five more divisions. The members of this subclass live anywhere from the soil, desert, and coast to caves, mammalian burrows, and vegetation. They live in accordance with where their prey lives. One division of the Geobiote feeds on maggots and eggs that are found in forest vegetation or in carrion. Naturally, these are found in heavily forested areas. The second and third divisions hunt for arthropods that feed on dead plant matter. Thus, these types of Geobiotes are found in the sand and burrowed in soil. The fourth type of Geobiotes feed on fly eggs that grow on fresh dung. This division of Geobiotes is found near animal homes such as nests and burrows. The last division of Geobiotes lives in caves. They feed on the mites and other arthropods that occupy the vegetation and fungi found there. This type of Geobiote is known to include species that become blind.

3. Microhisterids

This subclade is the smallest of the four. They live on plant litter and feed on the tiny arthropods found there. Microhisterids, like all other Histeridae, become specialized to hunt their prey and live in their habitats. Like the fifth division of Geobiotes, some Microhisterids are known to be blind as well.

4. Inquilines

This division consists of those Histeridae that live in close proximity with social colonies of arthropods such as ants and termites. Histeridae that live near ants can live in a harmonious or hostile relationship. The hostile hister beetles feed on the ants. The harmonious hister beetles eat the same food as the ants, however they may not be in direct competition for the food. These beetles have an excretory organ that produces an odor telling the ants they mean no harm.

Current research
Because members of the family Histeridae can be found on carrion, they have proven to be important in certain forensic investigations. The predacious hister beetles will feed on the various insects on the body, primarily Diptera. To estimate a person's time of death, forensic investigators must look at the insects on the body and determine time of colonization. If the Histeridae beetles are present, the investigator can assume that some of the other insects have been eaten by the hister beetles. Due to their importance in forensic entomology, research is continually being conducted on this family's life cycle and development, their prevalence in specific locations, and their geographical distribution.

A study was conducted at Hacettepe University in Ankara, Turkey. Forty species of Coleoptera, including the hister beetles, were observed on twelve pig carcasses over a one-year period. The beetles’ distribution and their time of colonization in the various decomposition stages over the year were examined and recorded.

Importance in forensics

Forensic entomology is the study of insects related to crime scenes. Insects can be very helpful at a crime scene and give people an idea of what happened and when it happened.

Flesh eating insects arrive at the dead body within a few hours. Certain species of the hister beetles follow shortly behind and prey on the maggots and other arthropods present. Insects that feed on dead bodies increase the rate of decomposition and their mandibular mouth parts can cause excess damage to the body. Insects can also help determine the season the body died in. The hister beetle is more prevalent in spring and summer.

The family Histeridae is very diverse, so different species can be found on the body at different times because of their various feeding habits. This needs to be noted when examining a dead body. They are predacious beetles and arrive when there is material to feed on, like other beetles or maggots. They do not actually feed on the carrion. For example, Hister quadrinotatus and Hister sedakovi arrive to feed when the carrion is bloat to dry (full of maggots to no maggots). In contrast, Saprinus pennsylvanicus arrive at the body first, when it is fresh to late (beginning of decomposition to advanced decomposition).

The hister beetles lay their eggs in dead bodies and over a short period of time they develop into various stages. The Histeridae larvae are destructive and when they hatch they eat the maggots in the dead body. The stage of the beetle and other insects in the body at the time of investigation helps to determine the time of death. "Beetle larvae are ... helpful when determining post-mortem time interval. Beetle larvae often reside in fly breeding resources, and they can be distinguished from fly larvae by the following: Beetle larvae possess a hard, head capsule, often brown in colour. Fly larvae lack a head capsule, instead having distinct, internal, black mouth hooks (cephalopharyngeal skeleton of mouthparts) at the anterior end of their body." Understanding how long ago the eggs were laid and the time period of the developmental stages is important for determining the time of death.

The hister beetles will hide under the dead body in the soil during the day and come out at night to feed. For this reason, the dead body must be examined at different times of the day. After collecting the hister beetles from a body, isolate them because they are predacious beetles and eat anything in their way.

Genera and species
Histeridae is a large and diverse family. There are more than 410 genera and 4,800 described species in Histeridae worldwide, with more than 500 species in North America. The beetles range in size, shape and color. Many of the adults are predacious.

See also
 List of Histeridae genera

References

Further references (not necessarily used inline)

Achiano, K. A., and J. H. Giliomee. "Biology of the house fly predator Carcinops pumilio (Erichson) (Coleoptera:Histeridae)." BioControl (2005). 14 Mar. 2005. 20 Mar. 2009 <https://web.archive.org/web/20110714075700/http://resources.metapress.com/pdf-preview.axd?code=362v3k1361r2x385&size=largest>.
"Hister beetles - Family Histeridae." Decomposition: Hister Beetles. 2003. Australian Museum. 11 Mar. 2009 <http://www.deathonline.net/decomposition/corpse_fauna/beetles/hister.htm>.
Stephens, Stephanie A. "An Overview of the Coleopteran Family Histeridae and its Significance to Forensic Entomology." 2003. 13 Mar. 2009 <https://web.archive.org/web/20090330011619/http://www.beetlelady.com/?page_id=7>.
Summerlin, J. W., and G. T. Fincher. "Laboratory observations on the life cycle of Hister nomas (Coleoptera: Histeridae)." Journal of Entomological Science. CABI. Vet. Toxicology & Entomology Res. Lab., College station. 20 Mar. 2009.

External links

 
Tree of life
Histeridae de German site
 Histeridae of Europe 
Overview of Histeridae
Summary
Forensic Entomology
Bug Guide
Lectures on Forensically Important Insects

 
Histeroidea
Beetle families
Taxa named by Leonard Gyllenhaal